Taenaris dimona is a butterfly in the family Nymphalidae. It was first described by William Chapman Hewitson in 1862. It is found in the Australasian realm.

Subspecies
T. d. dimona (Serang, Ambon)
T. d. dinora Grose-Smith & Kirby, 1896  (New Guinea)
T. d. sorronga Fruhstorfer, 1905  (New Guinea: Sorong)
T. d. offaka Fruhstorfer, 1905 (Waigeu)
T. d. dimonata Stichel, 1906  (Salawati)
T. d. didorus Brooks, 1944 (Misool)
T. d. aruensis Brooks, 1944 (Aru)
T. d. anna Fruhstorfer, 1915 (New Guinea: Arfak)
T. d. kapaura  Fruhstorfer, 1904  (New Guinea: Onin Peninsula to Geelvink Bay)
T. d. zaitha Fruhstorfer, 1914  (New Guinea: Snow Mountains)
T. d. microps Grose-Smith, 1894  (New Guinea: Humboldt Bay)
T. d. areia  Fruhstorfer, 1904  (New Guinea: Astrolabe Bay to Finschhaffen)
T. d. thaema Fruhstorfer, 1915  (Huon Peninsula)
T. d. sophaineta Fruhstorfer, 1914  (Yule Island)

References

External links
Taenaris at Markku Savela's Lepidoptera and Some Other Life Forms

Taenaris
Butterflies described in 1862